Chor Chor is a 1974 Bollywood drama film directed by Prem Prakash. The film stars Vijay Anand. This is one of the best suspense thrillers that Bollywood has made. It is surprising that very few people know about this movie. Perhaps the cast of the film: Vijay Anand, Trilok Kapoor, Ranjan, Jairaj etc., were not able to attract audiences. Furthermore, this was a song-less movie. Leena Chandavarkar has never looked as beautiful, romantic and lovely as she looked and performed in this movie. One must view this movie for its presentation and of course, for Leena Chandavarkar.

Plot
Bank manager Akash searches for his father's killer in a small town of panchgani.

Cast
Vijay Anand  
Leena Chandavarkar   
 Trilok Kapoor
Iftekhar   
P. Jairaj     
Keshto Mukherjee

External links
 

1974 films
1970s Hindi-language films
1974 drama films